Sinclair Oil Corporation was an American petroleum corporation, founded by Harry F. Sinclair on May 1, 1916, the Sinclair Oil and Refining Corporation combined, amalgamated, the assets of 11 small petroleum companies. Originally a New York corporation, Sinclair Oil reincorporated in Wyoming in 1976. The corporation's logo featured the silhouette of a large green sauropod dinosaur, based on the then-common idea that oil deposits beneath the earth came from the dead bodies of dinosaurs. 
It was ranked on the list of largest privately owned American corporations. It owned and operated refineries, gas stations, hotels, a ski resort, and a cattle ranch.

History
Sinclair has long been a fixture on American roads with its dinosaur logo and mascot, a Brontosaurus.

1916–1969

During September 1919, Harry Sinclair restructured Sinclair Oil and Refining Corporation, Sinclair Gulf Corporation, and 26 other related entities into Sinclair Consolidated Oil Corporation. In 1932, this new entity was renamed Consolidated Oil Corporation. In 1943, it was renamed Sinclair Oil Corporation.

Near the beginning of the Great Depression, Sinclair sold the remaining interest in its pipeline subsidiary to Standard Oil Company (Indiana) for US$72.5 million (Standard Oil had purchased a 50% interest in the pipeline subsidiary in 1921). With these funds, including an additional US$33.5 million from an additional common stock issue, Sinclair retired several promissory notes and prepared to weather the Depression with the remaining supply of cash.

Between 1921 and 1922, Sinclair leased oil production rights to Teapot Dome in Wyoming without competitive bidding. This led to the Teapot Dome scandal.

At that time, Sinclair Oil seemed to offer a viable alternative to the Italian fascist government, which was officially aiming to boost competition; in fact, most of the Italian oil market was controlled by the Italo-American Petroleum Society (SIAP), which in turn was fully dominated by Standard Oil. As the Teapot Dome scandal unfolded in the United States and reached the international press, Mussolini accelerated the negotiations, with a deal signed on May 4, 1924 (although without an official meeting, to avoid public outcry). In this regard, Sinclair Oil Company is known for having made "large payments to leading Fascists—all acting as intermediaries for Benito Mussolini—in return for an exclusive monopoly to drill for oil on Italian soil and in the Italian colonies". The deal was reported in a press release by the Head of Government (Mussolini) issued on the night of May 15, 1924, and published by most newspapers on the following day: the press release assured the public that Sinclair Oil had been awarded its contract on a competitive basis and had provided guarantees it had no relations with the international oil trust. This case of corruption was reported by the anti-fascist politician Giacomo Matteotti - who was later kidnapped and killed by Mussolini's newborn secret police, just before he could report his discoveries to the Parliament - in his posthumous article, published in the July issue of English Life (a magazine founded by Brendan Bracken): Matteotti accused Sinclair Oil of being a pawn of Standard Oil, as well as revealing "grave irregularities concerning the concession." Matteotti's theses were echoed in the notes of Epifanio Pennetta, who contributed to the preliminary investigation on the murder: "To all appearances," companies like Nafta and Saper "were in competition with the Sinclair company, while in fact they were in cahoots with Sinclair" and added that Sinclair Oil was actually working "in concert" with Standard Oil.

During the Great Depression, Sinclair saved many other petroleum companies from receivership or bankruptcy and acquired others to expand its operations. In 1932, Sinclair purchased the assets of Prairie Oil and Gas' pipeline and producing companies in the southern United States, and the Rio Grande Oil Company in California. The purchase of Prairie also gave Sinclair a 65% interest in Producers and Refiners Corporation (or Parco), which Sinclair subsequently acquired when Parco entered receivership in 1934. Lastly, in 1936, Sinclair purchased the East Coast marketing subsidiary of Richfield Oil Company, which had operated in receivership for several years. Richfield then reorganized, resulting in the creation of the Richfield Oil Corporation. Sinclair was instrumental in transferring capital and managerial assets into Richfield. Thirty years later, Richfield merged with Atlantic Refining, located on the East Coast, forming Atlantic Richfield.

At the Chicago World's Fair of 1933–1934, Sinclair sponsored a dinosaur exhibit meant to play on the link between the formation of petroleum deposits and the time of dinosaurs, now a largely discredited misconception. The exhibit included a 2-ton animated model of a Brontosaurus. The exhibit proved so popular it inspired a promotional line of rubber brontosaurs at Sinclair stations, complete with wiggling heads and tails, and the eventual inclusion of the brontosaur logo. Later, inflatable dinosaurs were given as promotional items. An anthropomorphic version appeared as a service-station attendant in advertisements. Some locations have a life-size model of the mascot straddling the building's entrance.

In the early 1960s, Sinclair developed the Turbo-S, along with Henry W. Peters, his son Eric Woods, aircraft oils used for reliability in commercial jets, military jets, guided missiles and space exploration rockets.

At the New York World's Fair of 1964–1965, Sinclair again sponsored a dinosaur exhibit, "Dinoland", featuring life-size replicas of nine different dinosaurs, including their signature Brontosaurus. Souvenirs from the exhibit included a brochure ("Sinclair and the Exciting World of Dinosaurs") and featured molded plastic dinosaur figurines. After the Fair closed, Dinoland remained as a traveling exhibit.

Two of the replicas (Tyrannosaurus and Brontosaurus) are still on display at Dinosaur Valley State Park near Glen Rose, Texas. Another, a model of a Trachodon, has been displayed at Brookfield Zoo outside Chicago, Illinois. A replica of a Triceratops is either owned by the Kentucky Science Center and was being stored outdoors at an industrial park in South Louisville, Kentucky in 2016  or was donated by Sinclair to the Smithsonian Institution and is on display as "Uncle Beazley" in the National Zoological Park in Washington, D.C.

In 1955, Sinclair ranked 21st on the Fortune 500; by 1969, it had fallen to 58th.

ARCO era

 
In 1969, Sinclair merged with the Atlantic Richfield Company (ARCO) after an attempted acquisition by the Gulf+Western Industries Corporation. Federal antitrust provisions required the new entity to divest itself of certain Sinclair assets. As a result, the East Coast operations of Sinclair were sold to BP (which has since purchased ARCO). After the ARCO acquisition, many Sinclair stations in the Midwest continued to use the dinosaur logo and opted out of using ARCO's "diamond spark" logo. Some northwest Sinclair stations partially retained the Sinclair brand for a time, using ARCO's blue rectangular logo, including the "spark" graphic, but with the word "Sinclair" substituted for ARCO.

Holding era

In 1976, ARCO spun off Sinclair by selling certain assets to Robert (Earl) Holding. Assets divested in the spin-off included ARCO's retail operations in the region bounded by the Mississippi River and the Rocky Mountains, and the rights to the Sinclair brand and logo, resulting in many stations along Interstate 80 keeping the dinosaur logo. The ARCO stations in Texas, New Mexico, Illinois, and some portions of Oklahoma were not affected by the divestiture. They continued as part of ARCO until ARCO pulled out of those states in the 1980s.

Headquartered in Salt Lake City, Sinclair was the 94th-largest private company in the United States. There were 2,607 Sinclair filling stations in 20 states in the Western and Midwestern United States. As of 2010, the corporation operated two refineries—one in Casper, Wyoming, and one in Sinclair, Wyoming. Sinclair operated a third refinery in Tulsa, Oklahoma, until it was sold to Holly Corporation on December 1, 2009. Sinclair's other operations included 1,000 miles of pipeline.

In the mid-2010s, Sinclair fuel stations began actively spreading across southern California, including Los Angeles, San Diego, and Fresno with holders offering attractive deals for potential clients to make the switch from a private brand to the Sinclair name brand.

By 2018, Sinclair gas stations were widely distributed across the United States, with dozens of gas stations in California, Colorado, Iowa, Idaho, Minnesota, Missouri, Montana, Nebraska, Nevada, Oklahoma, Oregon, South Dakota, Utah, and Wyoming; smaller numbers in Arizona, Connecticut, Kansas, Kentucky, North Dakota, New Mexico, New York, Texas, and Washington; and a single station in Arkansas and Wisconsin.

Sinclair continued to use the green dinosaur, affectionately called "Dino" and marketed all its products under the logo. Sinclair patented the gasoline additive SG-2000. The high-octane fuel blend was called "Dino Supreme" and regular gas was "Dino", trade names used since 1961 when many oil companies still used trade names for their fuels instead of generic terms such as "regular," "premium," or "unleaded". Before that time, Sinclair's trade names for its gasoline products included "Power X" for high-octane fuel and "Sinclair H-C" for regular gas. Sinclair also has marketed products such as Dino, Dino Supreme, and Opaline motor oils.

In August 2021, HollyFrontier announced the acquisition of Sinclair Oil. A new company named HF Sinclair Corporation would be formed in 2022. Under the agreements, Sinclair Oil’s branded marketing business and all related commercial activities and its refineries and related operations and assets in Casper and Sinclair, Wyoming, would be combined with HollyFrontier. Sinclair Oil’s logistics and storage assets, including approximately 1,200 miles of pipelines, two crude oil terminals and eight light product terminals, would be combined with Holly Energy Partners (HEP). It was expected that the vast majority of Sinclair Oil employees would be invited to continue in their positions following the combination. The transaction did not include exploration and production assets owned by Sinclair Oil & Gas Co.

Sinclair Trucking Company
Company-owned Sinclair Trucking provided distribution for Sinclair Oil fuels and other related products. Terminals were located in:
 Flagstaff, Arizona
 Denver, Colorado (Henderson, Colorado)
 Des Moines, Iowa
 Kansas City, Kansas
 Minneapolis, Minnesota
 St. Louis, Missouri
 Omaha, Nebraska
 Shawnee, Oklahoma
 Tulsa, Oklahoma
 Salt Lake City, Utah
 Casper, Wyoming
 Sinclair, Wyoming
 Carrollton, Missouri

Grand America Hotels & Resorts
Sinclair also owned and operated Grand America Hotels & Resorts, which has hotel properties in Salt Lake City, Utah; Flagstaff, Arizona; Cheyenne, Wyoming; Little America, Wyoming; and San Diego, California, in addition to the Sun Valley and Snowbasin ski resorts. These properties were not part of the sale to HollyFrontier, and continue to be owned by the Holding Family.

HF Sinclair Corporation 
In March 2022, the sale to HollyFrontier was completed, and HF Sinclair Corporation traded on the NYSE under the ticker symbol DINO.

In popular culture

The "Sinclair's Dino" balloon first appeared in the Macy's Thanksgiving Day Parade in 1963, returning to the parade in 2015 after a nearly 40 year absence. The balloon is an honorary member of New York's Museum of Natural History as of 1977.

The Brontosaurus logo is parodied in the Toy Story and Cars franchise films as being the "Dinoco" gas station chain, perhaps an allusion to gasoline and its origin as a fossil fuel, as well as a portmanteau between the "dinosaur" in Sinclair's logo and the suffixes of the "Amoco", "Conoco", and "Sunoco" franchises.

The TV series Dinosaurs featured several characters with names derived from fossil fuel companies.  The main character and his family had the surname Sinclair.

Sinclair once had a service station in Montgomery, Alabama, in the Cloverdale neighborhood, that closed in the 1970s. That location was remodeled in 1992 into a restaurant named Sinclair's in honor of the former neighborhood station. The ownership group also opened two other locations, one at Lake Martin and one on the eastside. The lake and Cloverdale locations were closed by 2018, while the eastside location has flourished for nearly 30 years as of 2021.

See also
 List of automotive fuel retailers
 Little America Hotel
 Teapot Dome scandal

References

External links

 Sinclair Oil Corporation
 

 
1916 establishments in Utah
ARCO
Automotive fuel retailers
Companies based in Salt Lake City
Economy of the Midwestern United States
Economy of the Western United States
Fictional dinosaurs
Gas stations in the United States
American companies established in 1916
Retail companies established in 1916
Energy companies established in 1916
Non-renewable resource companies established in 1916
Oil companies of the United States
Privately held companies based in Utah
2022 mergers and acquisitions